KPOK is a Country formatted broadcast radio station licensed to Bowman, North Dakota, serving Bowman and Bowman County, North Dakota.  KPOK is owned and operated by JAK Communications, Limited Liability Company.

Station Sale
It was announced in "Upper Midwest Broadcasting" (May 26, 2017) that KPOK was being sold. JAK Communications, Limited Liability Company was to buy KPOK from Tri-State Communications for $125,000. JAK is owned by Angela Headley of Bowman, Karen Paulson of Bowman, and Haley Sabe of Scranton. The future format of the station after sale is unknown. The purchase by JAK Communications was consummated on July 8, 2017, at a price of $97,000.

References

External links
 KPOK 1340AM Online

1980 establishments in North Dakota
Country radio stations in the United States
Radio stations established in 1980
POK
Bowman County, North Dakota